Xylobiops texanus is a species of horned powder-post beetle in the family Bostrichidae. It is found in the Caribbean Sea, Central America, and North America.

References

Further reading

External links

 

Bostrichidae
Articles created by Qbugbot
Beetles described in 1878